Taebong was a state established by Gung Ye on the Korean Peninsula in 901 during the Later Three Kingdoms.

Name
The state's initial name was Goryeo, after the official name of Goguryeo, a previous state in Manchuria and the northern Korean Peninsula, from the 5th century. Gung Ye changed the state's name to Majin in 904, and eventually to Taebong in 911. When Wang Geon overthrew Gung Ye and founded the Goryeo dynasty, he restored its original name.

To distinguish Gung Ye's state from Wang Geon's state, later historians call this state Later Goguryeo (Hugoguryeo) or Taebong, its final name.

History
Taebong was established with the support of the rebellious Silla people, the mixed Goguryeo-Lelang people.

According to legend, Gung Ye was a son of either King Heonan or King Gyeongmun of Silla. A soothsayer prophesied that the newborn baby would bring disaster to Silla, so the King ordered his servants to kill him. However, his nurse hid Gung Ye and raised him secretly. He joined Yang Gil's rebellion force in 892. Silla, after nearly a millennium as a centralized kingdom, was quickly declining, and Gung Ye instigated his own rebellion and absorbed Wang Geon's forces at Songak. In 898, He set up the capital in Songak. He eventually defeated Yang Gil and other local lords in central Korea to proclaim himself king in 901.

Gung Ye transferred the capital from Songak to Cheorwon in 905. Taebong at its peak consisted of territory in the present-day provinces of North and South Hwanghae, Gyeonggi, Gangwon/Kangwon, Pyongyang, North Chungcheong and the southern part of South Jeolla.

In his later days, Gung Ye proclaimed himself a Buddha and became a tyrant who sentenced death to anyone opposing him, including his own wife. Lady Gang. As a result, in 918 four of his own generals—Hong Yu, Bae Hyeon-gyeong, Shin Sung-gyeom and Bok Ji-gyeom—overthrew Taebong and installed Wang Geon as King Taejo.

Soon thereafter, Goryeo was established. Taebong influenced Goryeo culturally. Gung Ye was originally a Buddhist monk. He encouraged Buddhism and changed the manners of national ceremonies Buddhist, including the Palgwanhoe (팔관회, 八關會) and Seokdeungnong (석등롱, 石燈籠, Stone lantern). These changes survived the death of Gung Ye and the fall of Taebong.

See also
History of Korea

References

918 disestablishments
Former countries in East Asia
Former countries in Korean history
History of Korea
Former monarchies of East Asia
Later Three Kingdoms